Sastamala is a town and municipality of Finland. It is located in the Pirkanmaa region. The municipality is unilingually Finnish.

Sastamala was created on January 1, 2009, when the municipalities of Vammala, Äetsä and Mouhijärvi were consolidated into a single town. Later, Kiikoinen also joined Sastamala in 2013. Today, its neighbouring municipalities are Huittinen, Hämeenkyrö, Ikaalinen, Kankaanpää, Kokemäki, Lavia, Nokia, Punkalaidun, Ulvila, Urjala and Vesilahti. Sastamala's administrative center is Vammala, which was home to about 10,000 inhabitants in the 2011 population survey.

There are two highways through Sastamala: Highway 11 between Pori and Nokia, and Highway 12 between Rauma and Kouvola.

Heraldry
The coat of arms of Sastamala is the former coat of arms of the now defunct municipality of Karkku, originally approved by the Karkku municipal council on November 26, 1962, and approved for use by the Ministry of the Interior on February 12, 1963. The coat of arms refers to the 14th century St. Mary Church of Sastamala. The explanation of the coat of arms is “in the blue field, a golden consecration cross with a crossed edge”. The coat of arms was designed by Lauri Ahlgrén.

History
The stone grave with its swords, dating to the 4th century in Ristimäki, Vammala, is reminiscent of the prosperous armed burials of the younger Roman Iron Age (200–400 AD) in coastal areas. It is also the only inland tomb corresponding to the coastal burial tradition at that time. During the Vendel Period, cemeteries became more common in the Sastamala area, which contributes to population growth and population density. The parish of Sastamala was the largest parish belonging to the historical province of Satakunta.

The name Sastamala first appeared in the form Sastamall in a letter from King Birger Magnusson from 1300 or 1303.

Geography
Sastamala is located on both sides of the Kokemäki River's watershed in the southwest corner of Pirkanmaa. The municipality is divided by Kokemäki River, Lake Liekovesi, Lake Rautavesi and Lake Kulovesi. Other significant severe waters in the municipality are Lake Houha, Lake Ylinen, Lake Kiikoinen and Lake Mouhijärvi.

There are a total of 161 villages in Sastamala, and two thirds of the municipality's population lives in rural areas and villages. The villages are organized into more than 40 village associations. The division of the village was created by the Great Partition in the 18th century and thus does not fully correspond to the current situation; for example, Illo and Putaja are located on the lands of other villages and are not listed.

Economy
In 2015, the municipality had 8,426 jobs. Of these, 8,5% were in primary production (agriculture, forestry and fisheries), 63% in services and 27% in processing. The share of the unemployed in the labor force was 12,3%. The largest corporate tax is paid by the building design company Partnos, the manufacturer of rubber and plastic products Teknikum and the manufacturer of district heating reed valves.

Culture

Sastamala has a long tradition in literature. One of the biggest themed events is the Old Literature Days (Vanhan kirjallisuuden päivät) in the town center during the summer. In July 2011, the Finnish Book Museum Pukstaavi was also opened in Sastamala, which promotes Finnish book culture and reading. Pukstaavi is a national museum that tells the popular story of a Finnish book on cultural history and social significance. At the beginning of 2013, the town of Sastamala was declared the "book capital of Finland".

Sights and happenings
 Vanhan kirjallisuuden päivät, book festival
 Sastamala Gregoriana, early music festival
 Skicenter Ellivuori
 Pirunvuori ("Devil's Mountain")
 St. Olaf's Church
 Herra Hakkaraisen talo
 Culturehouse Jaatsi
 Lakeside Golf Vammala
 Sarkia museum
 Keikyä museum
 Kokemäki River

Sports
VaLePa (or Vammalan Lentopallo) is a volleyball club founded in 1978 in Vammala, Sastamala, whose representative team plays in the Finland Volleyball League. The six Finnish championships won by VaLePa will take place in 2012, 2014, 2017, 2018, 2019 and 2021. VaLePa has won the Finnish Championship silver in 2011 and 2016 and the Fourth Championship bronze in 1992, 2008, 2013 and 2015.

International relations

Twin towns — Sister cities
Sastamala is twinned with:

  Skövde, Sweden  
  Ringsted, Denmark  
  Halden, Norway
  Kashin, Russia
  Kuressaare, Estonia
  Vásárosnamény, Hungary

See also
 Karkku
 Kiikka
 Suodenniemi
 Tyrvää

Sources

Literature

References

External links

 Town of Sastamala – Official website 

 
Cities and towns in Finland
Populated places established in 2009